Chamartín is an administrative district of Madrid, Spain and consists of the following neighborhoods: El Viso, La Prosperidad, Ciudad Jardín, Hispanoamérica, Nueva España, and Castilla.
It was originally named Chamartín de la Rosa and remained an independent municipality until it was incorporated to Madrid in 1948.

Overview
It is bounded by the Paseo de la Castellana to the west, the Autopista de Circunvalación M-30 to the north and east, and the Autovía A-2 to the south.

Some of the landmarks of Chamartín are the Gate of Europe, a pair of inclined office buildings; the Santiago Bernabéu Stadium, home of the football team Real Madrid; Chamartín Station, the second-largest train station in Madrid; the Cuatro Torres Business Area, a business park that comprises the four tallest skyscrapers in Spain; and the National Auditorium of Music (the main concert hall in Madrid) which hosts the Spanish National Orchestra.

Geography

Subdivision
The district is administratively divided into 6 wards (Barrios):
Castilla
Ciudad Jardín
El Viso
Hispanoamérica
Nueva España
Prosperidad

Economy
The district has the head office of Iberia Airlines and the head office of Iberia Express.

References

External links

 Chamartin in the official website of Madrid City Council

 
Districts of Madrid
Former municipalities in Spain